Jeanette Alyssa Rodriguez (born July 22, 1990) is a judoka from United States.

External links 
 
 
 

1990 births
Living people
American female judoka
Place of birth missing (living people)
Pan American Games medalists in judo
Pan American Games bronze medalists for the United States
Judoka at the 2007 Pan American Games
Medalists at the 2007 Pan American Games
21st-century American women